Michiko Francoise Toyama Muto (February 14, 1908 – October 23, 2000) was a Japanese American composer. She was one of the first women invited to study at the  Columbia–Princeton Electronic Music Center (today known as the Computer Music Center).

Toyama was born in California to Japanese parents Noryuki Toyama and Fuku Nakahara. Her family visited Japan several times, and she attended college in the United States and Japan. In 1936, she studied with Nadia Boulanger in Paris. In 1937, Jacques Ibert recommended that Toyama submit her composition Voice of Yamato to the 15th Festival of the International Society for Contemporary Music (ISCM), where it won a prize. The same year, she married Hideo Muto; they had one child, Lucile.

Toyama was interned at the Rohwer War Relocation Center in the United States during World War II following the signing of Executive Order 9066. She was described there as a musician and semiskilled in the manufacture of knit goods.

In 1952, Toyama studied with Darius Milhaud, Olivier Messiaen, and Noel Gallon at the Paris Conservatory. In 1955, she received a scholarship to study at Tanglewood with Roger Sessions. She studied conducting at the Pierre Monteux School and Columbia University. From 1956 to 1959 she was one of the first women to study at the Columbia-Princeton Electronic Music Center with Dr. Otto Luening and Dr. Vladimir Ussachevsky. At the Center, Toyama and Edgard Varese shared an enthusiasm for Japanese gagaku court music. In 1960, Toyama's compositions were released on Folkways Records Album No. FW 8881.

Toyama said, "composing music is my joy and I do it for myself. I hope my compositions will be performed, but I do not dare to organize performance opportunities for my compositions by myself."

Works 
Toyama published her music under the name Michiko Toyama. Her compositions include:

Electronic 

Aoi No Ue (tape and narrator)
Waka (tape and narrator; text by Hyaku-nin Shu)

Orchestra 

Japanese Suite

Vocal 

Voice of Yamato (soprano, flute, clarinet, bassoon and cello)
"Two Old Folk Songs" (voice and koto)

Listen to Waka by Michiko Toyama

References 

American women composers
1908 births
2000 deaths
Conservatoire de Paris alumni
Tanglewood Music Center alumni
Columbia University alumni
American electronic musicians
Japanese-American internees
American musicians of Japanese descent
20th-century American women